Ernesto Alguera (born 4 February 1961) is a Nicaraguan boxer. He competed in the men's bantamweight event at the 1980 Summer Olympics. At the 1980 Summer Olympics, he lost to Bernardo Piñango of Venezuela.

References

External links

1961 births
Living people
Nicaraguan male boxers
Olympic boxers of Nicaragua
Boxers at the 1980 Summer Olympics
Place of birth missing (living people)
Bantamweight boxers